Dalton Town with Newton is a civil parish in the Borough of Barrow-in-Furness in Cumbria, England.  The parish contains the market town of Dalton-in-Furness, the hamlet of Newton and surrounding countryside.  The civil parish contains 70 listed buildings that are recorded in the National Heritage List for England.  Of these, one is listed at Grade I, the highest of the three grades, two are at Grade II*, the middle grade, and the others are at Grade II, the lowest grade.  Most of the listed buildings are houses and shops in or near the centre of the town.  The oldest listed building is Dalton Castle, a free-standing tower in the centre of the town.  Other listed buildings include a country house and associated structures, a farm and farm buildings, public houses, churches, a lime kiln, a pinfold, a market cross, public buildings, schools, a bank, and a war memorial.


Key

Buildings

References

Citations

Sources

Lists of listed buildings in Cumbria
Buildings and structures in Barrow-in-Furness